Reuben Lasker (December 1, 1929 – March 12, 1988) was a fisheries scientist known for his contributions to larval ecology, particularly the Stable Ocean Hypothesis.

Early life and education
Lasker was born to Theodore and Mary Lasker in Brooklyn, New York, on December 1, 1929. He attended the Boys' High School in Brooklyn, graduating at the age of 16. Lasker began his academic career at the University of Miami in 1946. Initially, he majored in English, but transitioned to zoology with notions of medical school. However, he graduated in 1950, and applied for (and won) a scholarship for graduate studies in marine biology. He studied marine shipworms and earned his master's degree at the University of Miami in 1952. For his doctoral degree at Stanford Lasker studied silverfish gastrology, earning the degree in 1956.

Lasker was married to Caroline Hayman with whom he had a daughter, Pamela, and son, Paul.

Professional career
In 1956, Lasker was awarded a post-doctoral appointment from the Rockefeller Foundation to culture euphausiid shrimps at the Scripps Institution of Oceanography in La Jolla, California. After teaching briefly at Compton Community College and being granted a Lalor Faculty Fellowship at Scripps, Lasker was recruited to the U.S. Department of the Interior Bureau of Commercial Fisheries' new research laboratory on the Scripps campus; he began federal service as a fishery research biologist in June 1958. Lasker was charged with establishing what would become the Physiology Laboratory.

Lasker and his teams went on to study various marine invertebrates, which eventually led him to his most widely recognized work with larval fish ecology. Most of his research centered around clupeid larval survival, feeding, and relevant environmental and planktonic variables within the California Current System (CCS).

In 1970, Lasker revitalized the academic journal Fishery Bulletin as its scientific editor. Under his leadership, the journal became a quarterly publication and its content tripled.

Lasker had been an Associate Professor of Marine Biology in Residence at Scripps since 1966 when he was appointed adjunct professor in 1973.

Awards
Lasker was awarded the Meritorious Service Award (Silver Medal Award) by the U.S. Department of the Interior in 1970, the Distinguished Service Award (Gold Medal Award) by the U.S. Department of Commerce in 1974, and the A.G. Huntsman Award for Excellence in the Marine Sciences by the Bedford Institute of Oceanography in 1983. In 1988, the American Institute of Fishery Research Biologists posthumously awarded Lasker its Outstanding Achievement Award.

Death and legacy
Lasker died of kidney cancer on March 12, 1988, at the age of 58. His ashes were scattered from the research vessel NOAA'S David Starr Jordan on April 27, 1988, in the ocean off Point Loma. Lasker's friends established the Reuben Lasker Memorial Fund after his death.

NOAA's Reuben Lasker

The NOAA ship Reuben Lasker, a National Oceanic and Atmospheric Administration fisheries research vessel, is named after Lasker.

References

Further reading

1929 births
1988 deaths
American marine biologists
American physiologists
Deaths from lung cancer
National Oceanic and Atmospheric Administration personnel
People from Brooklyn
Stanford University alumni
Rosenstiel School of Marine and Atmospheric Science alumni
Department of Commerce Gold Medal
20th-century American zoologists
Scientists from New York (state)